The 1926–27 CPHL season was the first season of the Canadian Professional Hockey League, a minor professional ice hockey league in Ontario, Canada. Five teams participated in the league, and the London Panthers won the championship.

Regular season

Playoffs

Semi-final
Best of 3

London Panthers beat Hamilton Tigers 2 wins to none.

Final
Best of 3

London Panthers beat Stratford Nationals 2 wins to none.

External links
Season on hockeydb.com

1926 in ice hockey
1927 in ice hockey
1926–27 in Canadian ice hockey by league